Dong Cheng (died 11 February 200) was a Chinese military general who lived during the late Eastern Han dynasty of China. He was also the father of Lady Dong, a concubine of Emperor Xian.

Life
Dong Cheng's origins are obscure: the Qing dynasty scholar Zhao Yiqing deduced that he was from the same clan as Dong Zhuo, while the Liu Song dynasty historian Pei Songzhi claimed that he was a nephew of Empress Dowager Dong, the mother of Emperor Ling ( 168–189).

Dong Cheng served as a military officer under Niu Fu, a son-in-law of the warlord Dong Zhuo, who controlled the Han central government and the figurehead Emperor Xian ( 189–220) between 189 and 192. His service under Niu Fu ended in 192 following Dong Zhuo's death and Niu Fu's assassination by his subordinate Huchi'er (胡赤兒).

In 195, Emperor Xian managed to escape from the generals Li Jue and Guo Si, who had been holding him hostage in Chang'an since 192, and return to the old imperial capital, Luoyang. Dong Cheng, Zhang Yang, Yang Feng, the White Wave Bandits and other loyalists came to protect the emperor from Li Jue and Guo Si, who attempted to capture him and bring him back to Chang'an.

After Emperor Xian and the loyalists reached Luoyang, internal conflict broke out between Dong Cheng and Yang Feng, who had support from the White Wave Bandits. Dong Cheng then chose to ally with the warlord Cao Cao. When Cao Cao showed up in Luoyang with his forces, Dong Cheng reported Han Xian and Yang Feng's wrongdoings to Emperor Xian and forced them to leave. Cao Cao then received Emperor Xian and escorted him to his own base in Xu (許; in present-day Xuchang, Henan), which became the new imperial capital.

As Emperor Xian feared that Cao Cao would attempt to dominate him and the central government and use him as a "trump card" against rival warlords, in 199 he appointed Dong Cheng as General of Chariots and Cavalry (車騎將軍) to balance against Cao Cao's influence in the imperial court. The emperor also gave Dong Cheng permission to open his own office and have his own staff – in the same way as Cao Cao did. Dong Cheng's daughter also became a concubine of Emperor Xian.

In the first lunar month of the year 200, Dong Cheng allegedly received a secret imperial edict from Emperor Xian ordering him to eliminate Cao Cao, so he contacted a few officials and plotted with them to assassinate Cao Cao. These officials included Zhong Ji (种輯), Wang Zifu (王子服), Wu Zilan (吳子蘭) and Liu Bei. However, Cao Cao caught wind of their plot and had them arrested. He then charged them with treason and had all of them (except Liu Bei, who had already fled) executed along with their families. Dong Cheng's daughter, who was pregnant at the time, was also killed despite Emperor Xian's efforts to save her.

See also
 Lists of people of the Three Kingdoms

Notes

References
 Chen, Shou (3rd century). Records of the Three Kingdoms (Sanguozhi).
 Fan, Ye (5th century). Book of the Later Han (Houhanshu).
 Pei, Songzhi (5th century). Annotations to Records of the Three Kingdoms (Sanguozhi zhu).

2nd-century births
200 deaths
2nd-century Chinese people
Han dynasty generals
People executed by the Han dynasty